1,3-Dichlorobenzene (also known as meta-dichlorobenzene) is an organic compound with the formula C6H4Cl2. It is the least common of the three isomers of dichlorobenzene, and it is a colorless liquid that is insoluble in water.  It is produced as a minor byproduct of the chlorination of benzene, but can also be prepared in a directed manner by the Sandmeyer reaction of 3-chloroaniline.  It also arises from the isomerization of the other dichlorobenzenes at high temperature.

Hazards
This chemical is combustible. "Hazardous decomposition products" are carbon monoxide, carbon dioxide, chlorine, hydrogen chloride gas. It is toxic to aquatic life with long-lasting effects.

See also 
Other isomers:

 1,2-Dichlorobenzene
 1,4-Dichlorobenzene

Other halides:

 Dibromobenzene

References

Chlorobenzenes